German Hill is a mountain in Barnstable County, Massachusetts. Prospect Hill is located west of German Hill.

References

Mountains of Massachusetts
Mountains of Barnstable County, Massachusetts